Yelwa Doma is a populated place located in Nasarawa State, Nigeria.

See also
 Doma, Nigeria – a Local Government Area in Nasarawa State, its headquarters are in the town of Doma.

References

Populated places in Nasarawa State